A slaughterhouse is a facility where animals are killed.

Slaughterhouse may also refer to:

Film and television 
 Slaughterhouse (film), a 1987 horror-comedy film
 "The Slaughterhouse" (Brooklyn Nine-Nine), an episode
 "Slaughterhouse" (CSI: Miami), an episode
 "Slaughterhouse" (Hell on Wheels), an episode
 "Slaughterhouse" (Justified), an episode

Music 
 Slaughterhouse (hip hop group), a hip hop supergroup
 Slaughterhouse (Slaughterhouse album), 2009
 Slaughterhouse (EP), a 2011 EP by Slaughterhouse
 Slaughterhouse (Ty Segall Band album), 2012
 The Slaughterhouse, a 2004 album by Prince
 SlaughtaHouse, a 1993 album by Masta Ace
 "Slaughterhouse", a 1987 song by Goo Goo Dolls from Goo Goo Dolls

Places
 Slaughterhouse Creek
 Slaughterhouse Beach (Mokule'ia), a beach on the island of Maui in Hawaii.
 Slaughter House Covered Bridge, Northfield, Vermont
 Yorba–Slaughter Adobe, fka Slaughter House, Chino, California

Literature
The Slaughter Yard, a story by Esteban Echeverría.

Other uses 
 Slaughter-House Cases, United States Supreme Court cases
 Slaughter House Gang, a 19th-century New York street gang

See also 
 Slaughterhouse-Five, a 1969 novel by Kurt Vonnegut
 Slaughterhouse-Five (film), a 1972 adaptation of the novel